The Tropic Rot is the fifth (and thus far final) studio album by American hardcore punk band Poison the Well. The album was released on July 7, 2009 through Ferret Music. The album was originally intended to be produced by J. Robbins, however due to a family emergency he had to be replaced by Steve Evetts.

The Tropic Rot received positive reviews and peaked at number 180 on the Billboard 200.

Track listing
All music and lyrics written by Poison the Well.
"Exist Underground" – 3:36
"Sparks It Will Rain" – 4:07
"Cinema" – 4:22
"Pamplemousse" – 5:51
"Who Doesn't Love a Good Dismemberment?" – 4:05
"Antarctica Inside Me" – 5:07
"When You Lose I Lose As Well" – 3:30
"Celebrate the Pyre" – 3:04
"Are You Anywhere?" – 5:25
"Makeshift Clay You" – 2:40
"Without You and One Other I Am Nothing" – 5:33
Vinyl edition bonus tracks
"D10 D11" – 4:10
"Deportation Spreads" – 4:08
Digital deluxe edition bonus tracks (from I/III / II/III / III/III)
 "New Fast" – 2:11
 "Purple Sabbath" – 4:52
 "Shuffle" – 3:20
 "Bowie" – 4:40
 "A#No.1" – 2:35
 "Run Desire Gone Clean" – 1:02

Personnel
Poison the Well

Jeff Moreira – vocals
Ryan Primack – guitar, keyboards
Bradley Grace – bass guitar, background vocals, guitar, stomps
Chris Hornbrook – drums and percussion
Brad Clifford – guitar

Production
Produced and engineered by Steve Evetts at Castle Oaks Production & The Candy Shop Studios
Mastered by Allan Douches for West West Side Music

Art
Layout and design by Sons of Nero

References

External links
"Exist Underground" live from Munich, Germany (March 21, 2009)

Poison the Well (band) albums
Ferret Music albums
2009 albums
Albums produced by Steve Evetts
Albums with cover art by Sons of Nero